Ilya Aleksandrovich Varlamov (born January 7, 1984, Moscow) is a Russian public figure, journalist, entrepreneur and video blogger.

He is the creator of author's media based on the LiveJournal blogging platform (later on Teletype). He is known for his photo reports from the actions of the political opposition in Russia and in the world, as well as materials about the urban environment in Russian cities. Since 2017, he has been actively running a YouTube channel called "varlamov", in which Ilya devotes most of the materials to the topics of urban studies, politics and news in Russia and the world. As of November 28, 2022, the channel has 4 million subscribers and 1235 million views.

Biography 

Varlamov was born and raised in Moscow. He is a graduate of the Moscow Architectural Institute with a degree in architecture at the Department of Residential and Public Buildings.

In September 2011 he launched the Ridus online media. In June 2012, he announced his withdrawal from the project, after which the entire editorial board changed in Ridus.

Awards 
 2011 – 
 2010 – 
 2009, 2011, 2012 –

References

External links

 

1984 births
21st-century Russian journalists
Living people
Journalists from Moscow
Russian activists against the 2022 Russian invasion of Ukraine
Russian bloggers
Russian explorers
Russian journalists
Russian liberals
Russian photographers
Russian Wikimedians
Russian YouTubers
Russian video bloggers